is a shōjo romance manga by Yoko Maki. It was serialized by Shueisha in Ribon from April 2002 and January 2005 and collected in seven bound volumes. It was adapted as a 26-episode anime television series produced by TMS Entertainment and Animax, broadcast in Japan on Animax from April to October 2004. The series is about a teenage boy, Kippei, who becomes the caretaker of his five-year-old cousin, Yuzuyu, after her mother abandons her. Both the manga and anime have been praised for successfully mixing serious issues with a light-hearted tone.

Plot
Aishiteruze Baby is a shōjo manga series that revolves around the life of Kippei, a popular high-school playboy who flirts with any girl he sees, without thinking about their feelings. His life is turned upside down when one day his aunt abandons his five-year-old cousin Yuzuyu at his house. Kippei is assigned the task of taking care of Yuzuyu for the time being, and he must learn how to become the "mother" she needs. As Kippei learns how to care for Yuzuyu, he also learns to care for Kokoro, a quiet girl at his school, who helps him out.

In Japanese,  is a casual, masculine way of saying "I love you" (see Gender differences in spoken Japanese).

Characters

Kippei is a 17-year-old promiscuous high school student, well known for his playboy habits. However, due to his friendly personality, he is very popular at school. One day, his 5-year-old cousin, Yuzuyu, is suddenly placed in his care. At first, Kippei is unsure of how to take care of his cousin. When he realizes that taking care of Yuzuyu is a full-time job, he drops his promiscuous ways. As the story progresses, Kippei matures quickly into a responsible "parent," making sure Yuzuyu is his top priority. Not only does Kippei wake up early every day to make Yuzuyu lunch, he walks her to and from her preschool. In addition, he cares for Yuzuyu's psychological well-being in the absence of her mother. Meanwhile, Kippei also pursues his love interest, Kokoro Tokunaga, whom he finds to be a great woman. Eventually, Kippei, realizing how lonely Kokoro is living by herself, asks his family to let her move in with them, which they quickly agree to. Near the end of the manga, Yuzuyu's mother returns to take Yuzuyu back but Kippei's mother refuses until her sister can prove to her that she is ready. Despite this, and his attachment to Yuzuyu, Kippei understands that she needs her mother and insists on letting Yuzuyu leave with her mother. At the end of volume seven, about 10 years have passed. Yuzuyu appears to be a happy teen and Kokoro is still living with Kippei, presumably they have married (which now makes her Kokoro Katakura). The manga ends with Yuzuyu's letter to Kippei, thanking him for taking care of her when she was young.

Yuzuyu ("Yuzu" for short) is a bubbly little 5-year-old girl. Having been abandoned by her mother, Yuzuyu begins to adapt to her new life with Kippei as her guardian. As the story progresses, Yuzuyu grows very attached to Kippei. When Yuzuyu meets Kokoro, she is scared Kokoro will take Kippei away from her. However, she eventually warms up to Kokoro and they become friends. Throughout the series, Yuzuyu struggles with the absence of her mother and is often seen crying herself to sleep. Yuzuyu tries her best in hopes that her mother will one day come back for her which conflicts with her wish to stay with Kippei. At the end of volume seven, Yuzuyu is a happy teenager who has reunited with her childhood friend, Shouta. She starts most of her sentences with "yuzu"-(ゆず).

Kokoro is a pretty classmate of Kippei. Because she lost her mother at a young age, she has a quiet personality. Her father quickly remarried and left Kokoro to fend for herself in a luxurious apartment, believing that because she was quiet, she would prefer to live alone. This is not the case, however, and she feels extremely lonely living by herself with no one else to rely on. Kokoro initially despises Kippei for his promiscuous ways. However, after seeing how gentle he is and how much he cares for Yuzuyu, Kokoro begins to fall in love with him. Kokoro sympathizes with Yuzuyu and understands Kippei's responsibility for Yuzuyu. As such, she lets him get away with a lot of idiotic behavior. At the end of volume six, for a brief time, Kokoro believes she's pregnant, only to find out that it was a false alarm. However, she admits to Kippei that she had hoped she was pregnant, despite the problems that would arise, because it would mean that she would be able to spend more time with him. Soon after, Kokoro moves in with Kippei's family. At the end of the manga, Kokoro and Kippei are living with his parents and it is implied that they are married (which now makes her Kokoro Katakura).

Misako is Kippei's mother who is a school crossing guard, among other things. She teaches Kippei how to cook, starting with onigiri (rice-balls) because they are Yuzu's favorite food. She is the older sister of Aunt Miyako (Yuzu's biological mother).

Better known as Nee-chan (or "Sis" in the English version), Reiko is Kippei's bold and controlling older sister. She is a cosmetologist and everyone in Kippei's family follows her orders. She is known for her stylish outfits and nails. She has a secret which she reveals to Kippei late in the series that she cannot have any children. This greatly influences how she feels about Aunt Miyako for abandoning Yuzuyu.

Miyako is the younger sister of Misako and the biological mother of Yuzuyu. She found that taking care of Yuzuyu by herself after her husband had died was more than she could handle. She later admits to Kippei that she once struck Yuzuyu and it is inferred that her fear of doing so again is the main reason why she left Yuzuyu with his family. She intends to come back once she can be a proper mother to Yuzuyu. In the end of the manga, she returns and takes Yuzuyu back. Years later, Yuzuyu is shown to be a healthy and happy teen.

Satsuki is Kippei's 12-year-old brother. He is very intelligent and mature for his age, so much so that he seems emotionless. Although he doesn't like children in general, he gets along with Yuzuyu very well. Near the end of the story it is assumed that Ayumi and Satsuki are in a relationship.

 and 
Voiced by: Maki Saitō (Aki) and Fuyuka Ōura (Mai)
Kokoro's friends. They, and especially Aki, don't approve much of Kokoro and Kippei's relationship, given his past actions and reputation. Rather than being busybodies, they really just want what is best for Kokoro. Aki is in love with Shin.

One of Yuzuyu's best friends and her first love. Kippei is unhappy that Yuzuyu has a crush on him. When Shouta first meets Yuzuyu, the two become instant friends and begin to do everything together. Shouta loves his family dearly, however he has been abused by his mother for some time. When Yuzuyu witnessed Shouta being hit, she began to cry and scream, and the entire preschool, as well as the parents, found out about him and his mother. Kippei is greatly affected by Shouta's being abused and tries to help by talking to the child's mother. Shouta later gets a concussion from a fall, precipitated by his mother, which results in a trip to the hospital. The doctors notice the signs of previous injuries and on their recommendation his parents decide to go into family counseling and move in with Shouta's grandparents for more support. When he leaves, he promises Yuzuyu that he will always be her friend. While separated, they remain in contact with each other. Eventually, he and Yuzuyu meet again as teenagers.

Miki is Yuzuyu's 14-year-old cousin on her father's side. Volume 4 of the manga is mostly Miki's story. In the manga, she carries a knife, which was changed to a bike chain in the anime. Miki attended a prestigious school where she witnessed a teacher beating a fellow classmate. When she confronted her teacher, everything backfired. She was harassed by her peers and teacher, but refused to tell her parents. Kippei notices the burns and scars on her wrists, indicating that Miki engaged in self-harm. She tries to take Yuzuyu away from the Katakura residence so that her parents will have a substitute for her when she attempts suicide, which Kippei prevents. (In the anime, she intends to jump from a building, in the manga she uses a knife.) In the end, the issues between her and her parents are resolved. She appears again in Volume 6.

 and 
Voiced by: Aoi Yūki as Aoi Yabusaki (Marika) and Yuutaro Motoshiro (Ken)
 Yuzuyu's friends from preschool. While Marika can be quite stuck-up for a five-year-old, Ken is kind and strong. Marika develops a crush on Kippei-onii-chan (as Yuzuyu calls Kippei) after he catches her when she trips – to the point that when her mother arrives to pick her up, she demands that her mother provide her with an onii-chan of her own. She is also jealous of the girls with whom he shows up at the pre-school (usually Kokoro). Marika is Yuzuyu's best friend.

Kippei's friend and classmate. He and Aki have feelings for each other.

Called "Nattsu" for short, she is Kippei's former "girlfriend" (more of a "friend with benefits" since it is implied that they have had sexual intercourse in the past). Since Yuzuyu's arrival, Nattsu misses hanging out with Kippei the way they used to. Although she enjoyed spending time with him, Nattsu had no interest in having a serious relationship with Kippei. The distance enforced by Kippei's responsibilities towards Yuzuyu have made Nattsu realize that she really cares for him (and has had feelings for him for some time). Unfortunately for her, her previous indifference means that she has lost her chance at Kippei since he is now serious about Kokoro.

Ayumi is Satsuki's classmate and works part-time as a model. She is four centimeters taller than Satsuki and secretly in love with him. Ayumi's friends decide to twit her about her feelings for Satsuki by making up rumors about Satsuki's preferences in girls which are the exact opposite of her appearance. Undaunted, she builds up the nerve to confess to him and is pleasantly surprised when Satsuki tells her that he does not mind any of her traits. She is later seen eating dinner at the Katakura house and is presumed to be Satsuki's girlfriend.

 and 
Akari is Kippei's classmate and her sister, Aya, goes to Yuzuyu's daycare where they are friends. Their situation is similar to that of Kippei and Yuzuyu in that Akari must take care of her sister because her parents are always working. Akari confides in Kippei which, among other things, results in trouble. They only appear in the manga.

Itagaki is a boy from Kippei's school who has a crush on Kokoro. He confesses to her and even forces a kiss on her, scaring Kokoro and making her afraid of being touched, even by Kippei. Everything is resolved during a school trip when Kippei warns Itagaki that he will kill him if he does anything to Kokoro. After this, Itagaki no longer appears in the manga.

Media

Manga
The manga Aishiteruze Baby was written and illustrated by Yoko Maki. It was serialized by Shueisha the shōjo (aimed at teenage girls) manga magazine Ribon from April 2002 to January 2005. The serial chapters were collected in seven tankōbon volumes under the Ribon Mascot Comics imprint. It is licensed in North America by Viz Media, which has released all seven volumes in English starting in April 2006. It is also licensed in France by Génération Comics, in Italy by Panini Comics, in Germany by Tokyopop Germany, and in South Korea by Seoul Media Group.

Anime

Aishiteruze Baby was adapted into an anime television series by TMS and Animax. It was directed by Masaharu Okuwaki, with music by Miki Kasamatsu and character designs by Junko Yamanaka and Masatomo Sudo. The opening theme was "Sunny Side Up" performed by Yo Hitoto, and the ending theme was  performed by Yo Hitoto.

The series was initially broadcast in 26 episodes across Japan on Animax from 3 April 2004 to 9 October 2004. It is licensed in France by Taifu Video.

Reception 

According to the German manga journal MangasZene, Aishiteruze Baby is drawn in a style typical of shōjo manga, with non-uniform panel layouts and frequent use of screentones. The reviewer praised the clean use of backgrounds, well-differentiated character designs, and Maki's handling of delicate issues such as the rival, Miki, and parental abandonment, while still keeping a comic tone. The same article described anime adaption as one of the shōjo anime highlights of 2004. The reviewer criticized the art of the anime adaptation as not as successful as the manga, being done in a simpler style, but praised the Japanese voice actors as well as mood-setting of the opening song, "Sunny Side Up."

A reviewer at T.H.E.M. Anime Reviews praised the anime as "a touching and heartfelt shōjo drama," giving it 5 out of 5 stars. The reviewer cited the character of Yuzuyu as part of the success, as "a kid who actually acts like a kid and not like a little adult." The reviewer noted that the animation was "somewhat low-budget," and that the character designs only somewhat resemble the Maki's designs in the original manga.

References

External links
 Shueisha's official site for Aishiteruze Baby 
 TMS' official site for Aishiteruze Baby 
 Viz Media's page
 Aishiteruze Baby Official Fansite
 

2002 manga
2004 anime television series debuts
2004 Japanese television series endings
Animax original programming
Anime series based on manga
Manga adapted into television series
Romance anime and manga
Shōjo manga
Shueisha franchises
Shueisha manga
TMS Entertainment
Viz Media manga